Uxbridge Vine Street station opened on 8 September 1856 as Uxbridge Station and was the earliest of three railway stations in Uxbridge, London.

History 
When opened, it was the northern terminus of the Great Western Railway's Uxbridge branch from the main line at West Drayton. South from Uxbridge town centre, the line ran near Whitehall Road and Cleveland Road.

The scheme never went ahead as the GWR withdrew its funding.

In November 1885, the Staines West branch opened sharing a short section of the Vine Street branch to connect to the main line.  An intermediate station at Cowley opened in 1904.

The Uxbridge Branch continued to be operated under British Rail until 10 September 1962, when the service from West Drayton was withdrawn and Uxbridge Vine Street station was closed to passengers. Goods traffic ceased two years later with the exception of the line south of the Grand Union Canal on which freight services were operated to the Middlesex Oil and Chemical Works in Yiewsley until 8 January 1979. Demolition of Uxbridge Vine Street station occurred in 1969.  Hillingdon Road now covers its site.

See also
 Uxbridge High Street railway station
 Uxbridge tube station
 List of closed railway stations in London

References

External links
Disused stations website with photos

Disused railway stations in the London Borough of Hillingdon
Former Great Western Railway stations
Railway stations in Great Britain opened in 1856
Railway stations in Great Britain closed in 1964
Former buildings and structures in the London Borough of Hillingdon
Uxbridge